Veeralipattu may refer to:

Veeralipattu, Malayalam film released in 1990
Veeralipattu, Malayalam film released in 2007